Jakub Grzegorzewski (born April 16, 1982) is a Polish football player who plays for Cracovia. He has also played for Heko Czermno and Korona Kielce. During the 2004/05 season, he helped to promote Korona to the Ekstraklasa.

References

1982 births
Living people
Polish footballers
Korona Kielce players
MKS Cracovia (football) players
Sportspeople from Piotrków Trybunalski
Association football forwards